Euxoa foeda is a moth of the family Noctuidae. It is found from the Altai Mountains through the Near East and Middle East to Turkey and the Levant.

Adults are on wing in June to September. There is one generation per year.

External links
 Noctuinae of Israel

Euxoa
Insects of Turkey
Moths of the Middle East
Moths described in 1855